Pettigrew's Girl is a lost 1919 silent film drama directed by George Melford and starring Ethel Clayton. It was produced by Famous Players-Lasky with distribution through Paramount Pictures.

Cast
Ethel Clayton - Daisy Heath
Monte Blue - Private William Pettigrew
James "Jim" Mason - Private Jiggers Botley
Charles K. Gerrard - Hugh Varick
Clara Whipple - Piggy

References

External links
 Pettigrew's Girl at IMDb.com

 lantern slide(archived)

1919 films
American silent feature films
Lost American films
Films directed by George Melford
Paramount Pictures films
American black-and-white films
Silent American drama films
1919 drama films
1919 lost films
Lost drama films
1910s American films